Velleia lyrata is a small perennial herb in the family Goodeniaceae, endemic to Australia. It is found mainly near Sydney, but also near the NSW and Queensland border, and in Queensland. A map of its occurrence records is given here. It grows in damp situations in heath on sandy soils. 
The cordate base to the adaxial sepal is a feature distinguishing it from many other Velleias. A full description of the plant is given in Flora of Australia online.

The species was first described as Velleia lyrata by the botanist Robert Brown in 1810  and the name has never been revised.

References

External links 
 The Australasian Virtual Herbarium – Distribution
 PlantNET – Description

Flora of Queensland
Flora of New South Wales
lyrata